Farley is a family name and a given name of various Irish and English origins. As an Irish patronymic surname, Farley is an anglicised form of the Old Irish patronyms Ó Faircheallaigh ("descendant of Faircheallaigh", a personal name meaning "super war") or Ó Fearghail ("descendant of Fearghail", meaning "man of valor"). As an English toponymic surname, Farley comes from places with the toponyms Farleigh, Fairley or Farley, deriving from the Old English fearn ("fern") and leah ("woodland clearing"), in turn derived from the Latin farneus ("oak").

People with the family name

In public service
Abraham Farley (1712–1791), English official, Chamberlain of the Exchequer
Albert Farley Heard (1833–1890), American diplomat, Founder of HSBC
Allen Farley (born 1951), American politician, Alabama House of Representatives
Bruce A. Farley (born 1943), American politician, Illinois House of Representatives
Ephraim Wilder Farley (1817–1880), American politician, U.S. House of Representatives
Sir Edwin Wood Thorp Farley (1864–1939), English politician, Mayor of Dover, Kent
Frances Farley (1923–2004), American politician, Utah State Senate
Frank S. Farley (1901–1977), American politician, New Jersey State Senate
Graham Farley (1933–2019), Australian colonel, 1999 Queen's Birthday Honours (Australia)
Hugh Farley (born 1932), American politician, New York State Senate
James Aloysius Farley (1888–1976), American politician, U.S. Postmaster General
James Indus Farley (1871–1948), American politician, U.S. House of Representatives
James Lewis Farley (1823–1885), Irish diplomat, Consul for the Ottoman Empire
James T. Farley (1829–1886), American politician, U.S. Senate
Jesse Farley Dyer (1877–1955), American marine, Medal of Honor
John Farley (1440–1490), English politician, MP for Gloucester (UK Parliament constituency)
John Farley (pilot) (1933–2018), English aviator, Order of the British Empire
John H. Farley (1846–1922), American politician, Mayor of Cleveland, Ohio
John J. Farley III (born c. 1942), American judge, U.S. Court of Appeals
Joseph F. Farley (1889–1974), American admiral, Commandant of the U.S. Coast Guard
Kai G. Farley (born 1973), Liberian politician, Superintendent of Grand Gedeh
Leo J. Farley (1926–1984), American politician, Mayor of Lowell, Massachusetts
Louis Farley (1860-1930), American politician, Mayor of Marlborough, Massachusetts
Michael Farley (1719–1789), American politician, Massachusetts Provincial Congress
Michael F. Farley (1863–1921), American politician, U.S. House of Representatives
Nancy Farley Wood (1903–2003), American physicist, Manhattan Project, NASA
Patricia Farley (born 1974), American politician, Nevada State Senate
Reginald Farley (born 1961), Barbadian politician, President of the Senate of Barbados
Reuben Farley (1826–1899), English politician, Mayor of West Bromwich, Sandwell
Rick Farley (1952–2006), Australian politician, Council for Aboriginal Reconciliation
Roy Farley (1923–1994), American colonel, 11th Armored Cavalry Regiment
Rusty Farley (1953–2011), American politician, Oklahoma House of Representatives
Steve Farley (born 1962), American politician, Arizona State Senate
Thomas Farley (physician) (born c. 1955), American doctor, New York City Health Commissioner
Thomas T. Farley (1934–2010), American politician, Colorado House of Representatives
Tricia Farley-Bouvier (born c. 1965), American politician, Massachusetts House of Representatives
William Wallace Farley (1874–1952), American politician, Chair of the New York State Democratic Committee
William Farley (Medal of Honor) (1835–1864), American sailor, Union Navy, Medal of Honor

Miscellaneous
Alec Farley (1925–2010), English footballer, English Football League
Caleb Farley (born 1998), American footballer, National Football League
Carole Farley (born c. 1955), American soprano, New York Metropolitan Opera
Charles Farley (1771–1859), English actor, Covent Garden Theatre
Chris Farley (1964–1997), American comedian, Saturday Night Live
Christopher John Farley (born 1966), American journalist, The Wall Street Journal
David Farley (born c. 1971), American journalist, The Wall Street Journal
Dick Farley (born 1946), American footballer, College Football Hall of Fame
Donald T. Farley (1933–2018), American professor, Cornell University
Francis Farley (1920–2018), English physicist, Fellow of the Royal Society
Harriet Farley (1812–1907), American abolitionist, Massachusetts Anti-Slavery Society
Homa Vafaie Farley, Iranian-born potter and ceramist
James Farley (actor) (1882–1947), American actor, Desert Law, The King of Kings
Jim Farley (businessman) (born 1962), American businessman, CEO of the Ford Motor Company
Jennifer Farley (born 1986), American actress known as JWoww, Jersey Shore
Jerry Farley (born 1946), American professor, President of Washburn University
John Murphy Farley (1842–1918), American cardinal, Archbishop of New York
John P. Farley (born 1968), American actor, Second City Theatre
John W. Farley (born 1950), American professor, University of Nevada
Katherine Farley (born c. 1950), American architect, Managing Director of Tishman Speyer
Kenneth Farley (born 1964), American professor, California Institute of Technology
Kevin Farley (born 1965), American actor, Second City Theatre
Lawrence Farley (1856–1910), American baseballer, Major League Baseball
Lilias Farley (1907–1989), Canadian painter, Canadian Centennial Medal
Margaret A. Farley (born 1935), American professor, Yale University
Marianne Farley (born c. 1979), Canadian actress, This Life, Imaginaerum
Morgan Farley (1898–1988), American actor, Mercury Theatre on the Air
Matthias Farley (born 1992), American footballer, National Football League
Paul Farley (born 1965), English professor, Fellow of the Royal Society of Literature
Patrick Farley (born c. 1978), American designer, pioneer of webcomics
Roland Bo Farley (1907–1999), American footballer, East Carolina Pirates
Silas Farley (born c. 1995), American dancer, New York City Ballet
Terri Farley (born c. 1966), American author, The Phantom Stallion
Thomas W. Farley (born 1975), American financier, CEO of the New York Stock Exchange
Tim Farley (born 1962), American programmer, James Randi Educational Foundation
Walter Farley (1915–1989), American author, The Black Stallion, The Black Stallion Returns
William F. Farley (born 1942), American financier, Owner of Chicago White Sox

People with the given name
Farley Drew Caminetti (1886–1945), American criminal, Caminetti v. United States
Farley Flex (born c. 1962), British musician, Canadian Idol
Farley Granger (1925–2011), American actor, Strangers on a Train
Farley Katz (born 1984), American humorist, The New Yorker
John Farley Leith (1808–1887), English politician, Member of Parliament
Farley Moody (1891–1918), American footballer, Alabama Crimson Tide
Farley Mowat (1921–2014), Canadian novelist, Order of Canada
Farley Norman (born 1961), American professor, Western Kentucky University
Farley Vieira Rosa (born 1994), Brazilian footballer, Israeli Premier League
Sir John Farley Spry (1910–1999), English judge, Chief Justice of Gibraltar
Farley Keith Williams (born 1962), American musician, Trax Records

Farley family of Somerset
 Farley family (18th century), English family of news media pioneers

Senators Farley
 Senator Farley (disambiguation)

Places with the name
 Farley (disambiguation)

References 

English-language masculine given names